Shí Miàn Mái Fú (十面埋伏) means "ambush from ten sides" in Mandarin Chinese and may refer to:
House of Flying Daggers, the English title for 十面埋伏 (Shí Miàn Mái Fú), a 2004 Chinese action/romance film
Ambush from Ten Sides, a classic pipa song